The Rockefeller Mountains are a group of low-lying, scattered granite peaks and ridges, almost entirely snow-covered, standing 30 miles (48 km) south-southwest of the Alexandra Mountains on the Edward VII Peninsula of Antarctica.

Discovered by the Byrd Antarctic Expedition on January 27, 1929, they were named by Byrd for John D. Rockefeller, Jr., a patron of the expedition. The geologist Laurence M. Gould and his team flew out to this mountain range in their plane; but after landing, a snow storm blew it half a mile away onto the ice, destroying it. This left them stranded for 11 days with limited food until the Byrd team in the Little America settlement could be reached and could send another plane to pick them up. These events are captured in the documentary With Byrd at the South Pole.

See also
Fokker Rocks, rock outcrops just south of Mount Schlossbach in the Rockefeller Mountains
Melbert Rocks, rock outcrops close north-west of Mount Paterson in the Rockefeller Mountains

References

External links

Mountain ranges of the Ross Dependency
King Edward VII Land